Hyphochytrium is a genus of Hyphochytriomycetes. Hyphochytrium species occur in soil.

An example is Hyphochytrium catenoides.

References

Further reading 
 
 

Heterokont genera
Pseudofungi
Taxa named by Friedrich Wilhelm Zopf